Terence Morris Browne, 9th Marquess of Sligo (28 September 1873 – 28 July 1952) was an Irish peer who succeeded to the title upon the death of his older brother, Arthur Browne, 8th Marquess of Sligo.

Browne was a younger son of Henry Ulick Browne, 5th Marquess of Sligo and Catherine Henrietta Dickon. He died unmarried and was succeeded by his nephew, Denis Browne, 10th Marquess of Sligo.

References
 Burke's Irish Family Records, p. 38, ed. Hugh Montgomery-Massingberd, London, 1978.
 The Complete Peerage, volume XIV, p. 502, 1998.

People from County Mayo
Terence
1873 births
1952 deaths
Terence
Earls of Clanricarde